Laura Ramirez Velez, (born March 2, 1990) is a Puerto Rican beauty pageant titleholder from Arecibo, Puerto Rico who was named Miss Puerto Rico 2011.

Biography
She won the title of Miss Puerto Rico on July 4, 2011, when she received her crown from outgoing titleholder Mariselle Morales. Ramirez's platform is “Transforming Lives: Promoting Values and Developing Dreams” and she said she hoped to motivate and inspire society through education during her reign as Miss Puerto Rico. Her competition talent is a Ballet en Pointe to "He’s a Pirate." Ramirez is a Journalism major at the Universidad del Sagrado Corazón in Santurce, Puerto Rico.

References

External links
 

Miss America 2012 delegates
1990 births
Living people
People from Arecibo, Puerto Rico
American beauty pageant winners
Universidad del Sagrado Corazón alumni